Ira ( or  or ) is a male and female given name. As a Sanskrit male name, its meaning is that of the wind-God, Vayu. As a Sanskrit female name (ईरा I-RA), its meaning is "the Earth". It is also the name given to Goddess Saraswati (Goddess of wisdom and knowledge).

In Russian, Ira is a female given name, a diminutive of Irina.

In Finland, Ira is a female given name, a version of the name of the Greek goddess Hera, Ήρα, queen of the gods and wife of Zeus.

In Hebrew, the name Ira (Modern Hebrew Ira, Tiberian Hebrew ʻÎrâ) has several meanings, 
among them "Watchful".

In the United States, the given name Ira was in the top 100 names from 1880, the first year recorded, until 1896 and steadily declined for over a century; only in 2016 did the name return to the Social Security Administration's top 1000 names.

Biblical 
Ira the Jairite, King David's priest or chief minister
Ira ben Ikkesh of Tekoa, a fighter among King David's Mighty Warriors

People 
Ira H. Abbott (1906–1988), American aerospace engineer
Ira Aldridge (1807–1867), American actor
Ira Allen (1751–1814), American politician
Ira Alterman (1945–2015), American journalist and author
Ira Angustain (born 1958), American actor
Ira Aten (1862–1953), American sheriff
Ira Babcock (1808–1888), American pioneer
Ira Baldwin (1895–1999), American scientist
Ira Coleman Batman (1862–1934), American jurist and politician
Ira Steven Behr (born 1953), American television producer 
Ira Berkow (born 1940), American writer
Ira Berlin (born 1941), American historian
Ira Bowman (born 1973), American basketball player
Ira Brown (born 1982), Japanese basketball player
Ira Byock (born 1951), American physician and author
Ira Colitz (1916-1998), American businessman and politician
Ira Condict (1764–1811), American college president
Ira Clifton Copley (1864–1947), American politician and newspaper publisher
Ira P. DeLoache (1879-1965), American real estate developer
Ira Deutchman (born 1953), American film producer
Ira Drukier (born 1945), American hotelier
Ira Dubey (born 1984), Indian film actress
Ira C. Eaker (1896–1987), American general
Ira Allen Eastman (1809–1881), American politician
Ira Elliot (born 1963), American drummer
Ira Flatow (born 1949), American radio and television journalist
Ira Fuchs (born 1948), American computer scientist
Ira A. Fulton (born 1931), American businessman
Ira Gershwin (1896–1983), American lyricist
Ira Gitler (1928–2019), American jazz historian and journalist
Ira Glass (born 1959), American radio presenter
Ira B. Harkey Jr. (1918–2006), American writer
Ira Hamilton Hayes (1923–1955), United States Marine and Pima Native American, photographed raising the flag on Mount Suribachi, Iwo Jima
Ira G. Hedrick (1868–1937), American civil engineer
Ira Herskowitz (1946–2003), American geneticist
Ira B. Hyde (1838–1926), American politician
Ira Kaplan (born 1957), American musician
Ira Katznelson (born 1944), American political scientist 
Ira Levin (1929–2007), American writer
Ira A. Lipman (born 1940), American businessman and philanthropist
Ira M. Lish (1855–1937), American politician
Ira Losco (born 1981), Maltese singer
Ira Magaziner (born 1947), American consultant
Ira Newborn (born 1949), American composer
Ira C. Owens (born 1936), American general
Ira Pastan, (born 1931), American scientist
Ira Pierce (1874–1906), American chemist and college sports coach
Ira Remsen (1846–1927), American chemist
Ira Sachs (born 1965), American filmmaker
Ira Sankey (1840–1908), American singer
Ira Sharkansky (born 1938), American political scientist
Ira Shor (born 1945), American educator
Ira Stoll (born 1972), American journalist
Ira Valentine (1963–2022), American football player
Ira Wolfert (1908–1997), American war correspondent

Fiction
Ira Buchman, fictional character in the American television series Mad About You
Ira Gaines, fictional character in the American television series 24
Ira S. Glicksberg or Sensei Ira, a recurring fictional character played by Lance Krall in the U.S. comedy series, The Office
Ira Goldstein, fictional character in ASB Bank advertisements in New Zealand
Ira Graves, fictional character in an episode of the television series Star Trek: The Next Generation, Data's "grandfather"
Ira Hath, fictional character in the Wind on Fire Trilogy by William Nicholson
Ira Hogeboom, fictional character in the video game L.A. Noire
Ira Levinson, fictional character in the 2013 Nicholas Sparks novel The Longest Ride, portrayed by Alan Alda and Jack Huston in the 2015 film of the same name
Ira Lowenstein, fictional character portrayed by David Strathairn in the movie A League of Their Own
Ira Poppus, a character in the 1992 TV comedy Revenge of the Nerds III
Ira Rosenbloom, fictional character portrayed by Richard Kind in the TV series Young Sheldon
Ira Shalowitz, a character in the 1991 American comedy film City Slickers
Ira Wright, fictional character portrayed by Seth Rogen in the comedy film, Funny People

See also
Ira (disambiguation)
Ira (mythology)

References

Hebrew masculine given names
Indian masculine given names
Polynesian masculine given names
Sanskrit-language names
Unisex given names